Frédéric Prinz von Anhalt (born Hans Robert Lichtenberg) is a German-American businessman best known as the last husband and widower of Zsa Zsa Gabor.  He took on his new name in 1980, after Princess Marie-Auguste of Anhalt adopted him as an adult.

Early life

Hans Robert Lichtenberg was born in Wallhausen near Bad Kreuznach in the Rhineland, Germany one of five children. His father was a police officer in Germany. He was trained as a baker and worked in the central market halls, later on he operated several sauna clubs in the Württemberg region.

Adoption and professed title

In 1980, at the age of 36, Lichtenberg was adopted by Marie-Auguste of Anhalt (1898–1983), then in her 80s and whose first husband had been Joachim, son of former German Emperor Wilhelm II. Upon adoption, Lichtenberg's name became "Frédéric Prinz von Anhalt" - "Prinz" (Prince) is part of the legal surname in Germany and not a princely title. Despite having no claim to royal or aristocratic heritage, Prinz von Anhalt styles himself "Prince Frédéric of Anhalt, Duke of Saxony and Westphalia, Count of Ascania". Some reports state that Anhalt claims to have been a childhood friend of Marie Auguste's only biological child, Karl Franz (1916–1975), and that the grieving mother adopted him out of kindness, calling him "Prince" and "Duke of Saxony". However, British press reports indicate that Marie Auguste was almost bankrupt and the adoption was a business transaction, allegedly masterminded by Hans Hermann Weyer, a former window dresser who became the honorary consul of Bolivia in Luxembourg. Weyer was known for selling certificates of nobility, doctoral degrees from fictitious universities, and other spurious decorations in Germany in the 1960s. Lichtenberg was one of about 35 adults adopted by the ex-princess, some then styling themselves Princes of Anhalt.

Regardless of the adoption by Marie-Auguste, a member of the deposed ducal family of Anhalt, the House of Ascania's website makes no mention of Frédéric Prinz von Anhalt, as he is not blood-related.

Marriage to Gabor
In 1984, Prinz von Anhalt moved to the U.S., becoming a socialite and living a flamboyant lifestyle. On August 14, 1986, he married Hungarian actress Zsa Zsa Gabor, who was 26 years his senior. It was his seventh marriage: he had married and divorced six times before, on one occasion receiving a settlement of $4 million.

It was Gabor's ninth marriage, but legally her eighth, as her marriage to Felipe de Alba had been annulled, because she was still married to Michael O'Hara at the time. It also became her longest marriage. "We didn't marry for love", Anhalt said. "It was a friendship, but when you're with someone over a certain time you fall in love."

Gabor claimed that, shortly after their marriage, she came close to arranging Anhalt's adoption by an anonymous member of the British Royal Family.

Since the death of Gabor in December 2016, Anhalt has inherited her Bel Air mansion and all of her assets as the sole remaining heir. Prinz von Anhalt claims that Gabor's late daughter, Francesca Hilton, stole Gabor's will while she was hospitalized, but due to her death in January 2015, it did not interfere with Anhalt's acquisition of her assets.

Candidacies for public office

On February 16, 2010, Anhalt declared he would seek the governorship of California, running as an independent candidate against Meg Whitman and Jerry Brown in the 2010 election. He withdrew his candidacy on August 2, 2010, citing problems with his wife's health. On September 18, 2017, Anhalt again declared himself a candidate in the 2018 gubernatorial election.

In October 2011, via a large billboard on Sunset Boulevard, Anhalt stated his intention to run for Mayor of Los Angeles in the 2013 election,  but then did not pursue this campaign.

Anhalt expressed his support for Donald Trump in several German interviews and television appearances.

Personal life

Clash with Gabor's daughter
Zsa Zsa Gabor's daughter, the late Francesca Hilton, alleged Anhalt compromised her mother's dignity, security and health for attention and profit. Hilton claimed Prinz von Anhalt prohibited Gabor from having visitors, including her own daughter.

Hilton claimed he fostered a circus atmosphere surrounding her mother's health, had plans to have her body preserved with plastic for public display, and claims Gabor wanted to mother a child at the age of 94, which she described as "just weird." Hilton remained worried about her mother's health, home and fortune.

At the time of her death, relations between Hilton and Prinz von Anhalt had been sour for nearly a decade. In 2005, he sued Hilton, alleging she had attempted to defraud her mother. However, Gabor refused to sign the papers in her husband's suit against her daughter so the court dismissed it.

Anna Nicole Smith affair
On February 9, 2007, Anhalt stated that he had had a decade-long affair with Anna Nicole Smith and could potentially be the father of her infant girl Dannielynn Birkhead, but in March, it was determined that Smith's former boyfriend Larry Birkhead was the biological father.

Robbery
On July 25, 2007, while sitting in his Rolls-Royce Phantom in Southern California, Anhalt was allegedly approached by three women whom he later described as attractive. He said they asked him to pose for pictures with them, at which point one of the women robbed him at gunpoint, taking his car keys, jewelry, wallet, driver's license, and all his clothes. According to Prinz von Anhalt, his assailants bound him and placed him in handcuffs, yet he managed to call the authorities on a cellphone. Los Angeles police found him stark naked approximately one hour later. No handcuffs were found at the scene. The culprits, apparently, drove away in a Chrysler convertible.

Adult adoptees
Together with Gabor, Anhalt has himself adopted at least 10 adult males. The adoptees included Oliver Prinz von Anhalt (1971-2016, birth name: Oliver Bendig) and Marcus Prinz von Anhalt. In addition to selling his name in marriage, Prinz von Anhalt has sold as many as 68 "knighthoods" for $50,000 apiece.

References

External links

Official website
 Frédéric von Anhalt Foundation (German)

Living people
Adult adoptees
American socialites
California Independents
Candidates in the 2018 United States elections
Gabor family
German adoptees
German emigrants to the United States
German socialites
People from Bad Kreuznach
Year of birth missing (living people)